is a compilation album by Japanese singer/songwriter Chisato Moritaka, released on November 25, 1999 after her marriage to actor Yōsuke Eguchi on June 3 and her subsequent retirement from the music industry. The album features a selection of deep cuts from Moritaka's 1989–1992 back catalog, plus her recording of "Hikisakanaide Futari wo", which she originally wrote for Noriko Katō in 1992.

The album peaked at No. 82 on Oricon's albums chart and sold over 3,000 copies.

Track listing 
All lyrics are written by Chisato Moritaka, except where indicated; all music is composed and arranged by Hideo Saitō, except where indicated.

Personnel 
 Chisato Moritaka – vocals (13)
 Hideo Saitō – all instruments and programming (13)

Charts

References

External links 
 
 

1999 compilation albums
Chisato Moritaka compilation albums
Japanese-language compilation albums
Warner Music Japan compilation albums